Hunter Kelly Ashworth (born 8 January 1998) is an American-born New Zealand footballer who plays as a defender.

Career

Pittsburgh Riverhounds
Prior to the 2020 season, Ashworth was signed by the Pittsburgh Riverhounds of the USL Championship. He made his league debut for the club on 12 July 2020, starting in an away match against Louisville City.

San Diego Loyal
On 13 May 2021, Ashworth joined San Diego Loyal SC. He made his debut for the club the following day in a 3–1 defeat to the Tacoma Defiance.

References

External links
Hunter Ashworth at University of San Francisco Athletics
Hunter Ashworth at UCSB Athletics

1998 births
Living people
San Francisco Dons men's soccer players
UC Santa Barbara Gauchos men's soccer players
Pittsburgh Riverhounds SC players
USL Championship players
New Zealand youth international footballers
Association football defenders
Soccer players from California
People from Laguna Beach, California
New Zealand association footballers
San Diego Loyal SC players